Alpine Elementary School may refer to:

 Alpine Elementary School (Alpine, Arizona)
 Alpine Elementary School, St. Vrain Valley School District, Longmont, Colorado
 Alpine Elementary School, Columbus City Schools, Ohio
 Alpine Elementary School, Alpine Independent School District, Alpine, Texas
 Alpine Elementary School, Alpine, Utah